Levick Mill is an unincorporated community in northeast Randolph County, in the U.S. state of Missouri.

The mill site is adjacent to Mud Creek on  Missouri Route J in the northeast corner of the county.

History
Variant names were "Levicks Mill" and "Pattonsburg".  A post office called Levicks Mill was established in 1872, and remained in operation until 1903. The community has the name of Abram Levick, the proprietor of a local mill.

References

Unincorporated communities in Randolph County, Missouri
Unincorporated communities in Missouri